"Do You Want the Truth or Something Beautiful?" is a song by English recording artist Paloma Faith from her 2009 debut studio album of the same name. It was released on 21 December 2009, and peaked at number 64 on the UK Singles Chart. It was co-written with Ed Harcourt.

Critical reception
Digital Spy gave the song 4/5, saying; 'Better yet, the song itself sustains the weight of her lyrical pretensions. A sumptuous, string-swathed ballad whose charms unfurl after three or four plays - all sung in Faith's customary dramatic way of course - it's elegant, filled with intrigue and as aromatic as a boudoir whose tart keeps forgetting to snuff out the candles'.

Chart performance
Despite Faith's first two singles reaching the top 20, "Do You Want the Truth or Something Beautiful?" failed to reach the top 20.

The single began to receive increased radio airplay throughout December 2009 and January 2010. As such, the single began to receive increasing amounts of digital downloads, and the song finally entered the UK Singles Chart on 2 January 2010 at number 90. It peaked at number 64 spending one week in the chart.

Music video
The music video for the song was released on 20 November 2009. The video has a retro style, and is similar to the "New York" video. It was directed by Chris Sweeney.

Track listing
Digital download

Charts

Release history

References

2000s ballads
Pop ballads
Soul ballads
Paloma Faith songs
2009 singles
Songs written by Paloma Faith
Songs written by Ed Harcourt
2009 songs
Epic Records singles